Alexandra Constituency was a constituency in Singapore. It used to exist from 1968 to 1988 and was merged into Brickworks GRC.

Member of Parliament

Elections

Elections in the 1960s

Elections in the 1970s

Elections in the 1980s

References 

Singaporean electoral divisions
Queenstown, Singapore
Constituencies established in 1968
Constituencies disestablished in 1988